Borjan Brankovski (born 15 December 1996 in Skopje) is a Macedonian professional shooter who is currently World No 113 and represents North Macedonia internationally in the men's 10m Air Pistol event.

Career
He participated in the 2019 European Games and secured 30th place in the men's 10 metre air pistol event and he also participated in the World Championships, World Cup and European Championships.

2020 Summer Olympic 
He qualified to represent North Macedonia at the 2020 Summer Olympics in Tokyo in the men's 10 m air pistol event.

References 

Living people
1996 births
Place of birth missing (living people)
Macedonian male sport shooters
European Games competitors for North Macedonia
Shooters at the 2019 European Games
Shooters at the 2020 Summer Olympics